Podlesie may refer to:

Podlesie, Dzierżoniów County in Lower Silesian Voivodeship (south-west Poland)
Podlesie, Wałbrzych County in Lower Silesian Voivodeship (south-west Poland)
Podlesie, Biłgoraj County in Lublin Voivodeship (east Poland)
Podlesie, Kraśnik County in Lublin Voivodeship (east Poland)
Podlesie, Bełchatów County in Łódź Voivodeship (central Poland)
Podlesie, Rawa County in Łódź Voivodeship (central Poland)
Podlesie, Dąbrowa County in Lesser Poland Voivodeship (south Poland)
Podlesie, Olkusz County in Lesser Poland Voivodeship (south Poland)
Podlesie, Oświęcim County in Lesser Poland Voivodeship (south Poland)
Podlesie, Gmina Czarna in Subcarpathian Voivodeship (south-east Poland)
Podlesie, Busko County in Świętokrzyskie Voivodeship (south-central Poland)
Podlesie, Gmina Pilzno in Subcarpathian Voivodeship (south-east Poland)
Podlesie, Jędrzejów County in Świętokrzyskie Voivodeship (south-central Poland)
Podlesie, Kielce County in Świętokrzyskie Voivodeship (south-central Poland)
Podlesie, Leżajsk County in Subcarpathian Voivodeship (south-east Poland)
Podlesie, Lubaczów County in Subcarpathian Voivodeship (south-east Poland)
Podlesie, Końskie County in Świętokrzyskie Voivodeship (south-central Poland)
Podlesie, Mielec County in Subcarpathian Voivodeship (south-east Poland)
Podlesie, Gmina Bogoria in Świętokrzyskie Voivodeship (south-central Poland)
Podlesie, Gmina Oleśnica in Świętokrzyskie Voivodeship (south-central Poland)
Podlesie, Białobrzegi County in Masovian Voivodeship (east-central Poland)
Podlesie, Radom County in Masovian Voivodeship (east-central Poland)
Podlesie, Sierpc County in Masovian Voivodeship (east-central Poland)
Podlesie, Jarocin County in Greater Poland Voivodeship (west-central Poland)
Podlesie, Koło County in Greater Poland Voivodeship (west-central Poland)
Podlesie, Oborniki County in Greater Poland Voivodeship (west-central Poland)
Podlesie, Słupca County in Greater Poland Voivodeship (west-central Poland)
Podlesie, Gmina Kamienica Polska in Silesian Voivodeship (south Poland)
Podlesie, Gmina Lelów in Silesian Voivodeship (south Poland)
Podlesie, Gliwice County in Silesian Voivodeship (south Poland)
Podlesie, Lubusz Voivodeship (west Poland)
Podlesie, Świebodzin County in Lubusz Voivodeship (west Poland)
Podlesie, Głubczyce County in Opole Voivodeship (south-west Poland)
Podlesie, Kędzierzyn-Koźle County in Opole Voivodeship (south-west Poland)
Podlesie, Nysa County in Opole Voivodeship (south-west Poland)
Podlesie, Pomeranian Voivodeship (north Poland)
Podlesie, Warmian-Masurian Voivodeship (north Poland)
Podlesie, Choszczno County in West Pomeranian Voivodeship (north-west Poland)
Podlesie, Stargard County in West Pomeranian Voivodeship (north-west Poland)
Podlesie, Wałcz County in West Pomeranian Voivodeship (north-west Poland)
Podlesie, Katowice, a district of the city of Katowice